Korean mandarin may refer to either:

 The yangban, Korean scholar-bureaucrats
 Crested shelduck, the Korean relative of the mandarin duck
 Gamgyul, a type of mandarin orange found in the cuisine of Jeju

See also

 
 Korean (disambiguation)
 Mandarin (disambiguation)